Brian Hamilton is an American entrepreneur and philanthropist. He is the co-founder of Sageworks, a fintech company that was acquired by Accel-KKR in 2018, and founder of the philanthropic organizations "Inmates to Entrepreneurs" and the "Brian Hamilton Foundation." He also stars in the television series Free Enterprise on ABC stations, where he helps people who have been incarcerated start businesses. In 2021, Hamilton invested in LiveSwitch (formerly Frozen Mountain), a Canadian video technology firm, and expanded its operations to North Carolina.

Early life and education

Hamilton grew up in Milford, Connecticut.   He attended Fairfield College Preparatory School. Brian was the first in his family to attend college, earning a bachelor's degree from Sacred Heart University.  Later he earned an MBA from Fuqua School of Business at Duke University.

Career

Hamilton ran his own consulting business in Durham, North Carolina from 1990 to 1996. He offered consulting to people trying to start businesses. He also gave lectures and taught college courses. During a small business course, Hamilton mentioned the idea of software that would make reading financial statements easier for executives. One of the students, Sarah Tourville, liked the idea. They would go on to form the company Sageworks in 1998.
 
Sageworks was one of the first fintech companies. It grew into a firm of approximately 400 employees and was acquired by Accel-KKR in 2018. Hamilton sold his stake in the company as part of the acquisition.

In 2021, Hamilton invested in LiveSwitch (formerly Frozen Mountain), a video technology company that provides streaming, video conferencing and interactive broadcasting solutions. With Hamilton’s investment, LiveSwitch planned to expand its operations and add jobs in North Carolina.

Charitable work 
Hamilton was a lecturer at prisons, being under contract with the SBA to help with a minority set-aside program. One of his clients, Rev. Robert Harris, asked him to be part of a prison ministry where Hamilton would discuss entrepreneurship. This led to Hamilton founding "Inmates to Entrepreneurs", a program that offers training and mentoring for aspiring entrepreneurs who have criminal records. Graduates often go on to start their own businesses.
 
In addition, he founded the Brian Hamilton Foundation, an organization that provides advice for young people and others who want to become entrepreneurs. He has provided commentary as an expert for The Wall Street Journal, MSNBC and Fox Business Network, and also sat on the board of trustees for Sacred Heart University.

In 2021, Hamilton became the star of the television series "Free Enterprise," which airs on ABC stations as part of the Hearst Media Production Group weekend programming block. The show features the stories of formerly incarcerated people with dreams of starting their own businesses. On the show, people with criminal records work with Hamilton and a team of mentors to start companies with little to no money. The show won two 2021 Telly Awards in the television categories of “social impact” and “social responsibility.”

References

External links
 Brian Hamilton Foundation website
 Inmates to Entrepreneurs website
 "Entrepreneur Brian Hamilton — Exclusive Interview", by The Henry Ford

Year of birth missing (living people)
Living people
American company founders
Sacred Heart University alumni
Fuqua School of Business alumni